"Amari"  (stylized as "a m a r i") is a song by American rapper J. Cole. It was released on May 14, 2021 on Cole's sixth studio album, The Off-Season.

Background
The song title, "Amari", is named after Dreamville president and manager Ibrahim Hamad's son, also the nephew of Dreamville rapper Bas.

Production and composition
J. Cole revealed how the song was created on Timbaland's BeatClub YouTube channel. The song was produced during a Twitch live stream by Timbaland. When Cole heard it, he contemplated reaching out, but wrote to the beat through a rip on the internet. He said "I looped up the YouTube lil' rip, made a whole song on this shit. I spent the next two days writing and recording the song, and right when I was 90% through writin' it, I was like, I should probably call him now and get the real file." After asking for the file and playing the song, Timbaland said he didn't save the beat and had to remake it.

Music video
On May 17, 2021, Cole released the official music video for "Amari" directed by fellow North Carolina rapper Mez, who also directed the "Middle Child" video. Scenes in the video features Cole rapping in front of a Dreamville helicopter and in a dorm-room with the wall lined with platinum plaques. A message saying "hold on to your inner child," reads at the end.

Critical reception
Writing for HipHopDX, Clark Trent said "The Timbaland-assisted "Amari" proves the magic ultimately falls on the beatpicker as T-Minus, Sucuki and Cole all combine for a relatively limp staccato blitz of guitar loops." Clash said Cole reflects "on his success and how he made it out even through trials and tribulations." Rolling Stone said the song was a standout on the album "as he alternates between agile rapping and serious singing."

Commercial performance
Upon its first week of release, "Amari" debuted at number 5 on the US Billboard Hot 100, becoming his third top five song on the chart.

Charts

Certifications

References

2021 songs
J. Cole songs
Song recordings produced by Timbaland
Song recordings produced by T-Minus (record producer)
Songs written by J. Cole
Trap music songs